Forestdale Cemetery is a public secular cemetery located in Holyoke, Massachusetts. The cemetery was officially organized on November 1, 1860, after a town meeting in October of that year designated a sum of $1,500 dollars (approx. $41,000 2016 USD) for the purchase of land; contributions for this land came from the Holyoke Water Power Company as well as local mills, with the acquisitions presided over by Jones S. Davis, engineer of Lyman Mills. The cemetery acquisitions were completed and dedicated on June 22, 1862 with speeches by Amherst professor J.G. Voss and one of Holyoke's founding figures, George C. Ewing. The cemetery, built during a time of great interest in landscape architecture, contains a deliberately chosen layout of ornamental trees and shrubs.

In addition to the many founding families of Holyoke, the cemetery is the resting place of many of the city's mayors and city officials, including William Whiting II and Roswell P. Crafts. Serving as a common burial ground for all citizens, it also contains a potter's field for indigents.

Notable burials
 Lettie S. Bigelow, poet and author
 Roswell P. Crafts
 William Whiting II

Gallery

Notes

References

1860 establishments in Massachusetts
Buildings and structures in Holyoke, Massachusetts
Cemeteries in Hampden County, Massachusetts
Cemeteries established in the 1860s